Jackson Paine is a former professional Australian rules footballer who played for the Collingwood Football Club and Brisbane Lions in the Australian Football League (AFL). He was recruited by the Collingwood Football Club with pick 50 in the 2011 national draft. Paine made his debut in round 1, 2012 against . He was traded in a straight swap for Patrick Karnezis in the 2013 trade period. He was delisted by Brisbane in October 2015, however, he was re-drafted in the 2016 rookie draft. He was delisted again by Brisbane at the end of the 2016 season following a battle with gout.

Statistics

|- style="background-color: #EAEAEA"
! scope="row" style="text-align:center" | 2012
|
| 33 || 6 || 8 || 3 || 28 || 20 || 48 || 16 || 16 || 1.3 || 0.5 || 4.7 || 3.3 || 8.0 || 2.7 || 2.7
|-
! scope="row" style="text-align:center" | 2013
|
| 33 || 0 || — || — || — || — || — || — || — || — || — || — || — || — || — || —
|- style="background:#eaeaea;"
! scope="row" style="text-align:center" | 2014
|
| 39 || 6 || 3 || 4 || 25 || 25 || 50 || 6 || 12 || 0.5 || 0.7 || 4.2 || 4.2 || 8.3 || 1.0 || 2.0
|-
! scope="row" style="text-align:center" | 2015
|
| 39 || 0 || — || — || — || — || — || — || — || — || — || — || — || — || — || —
|- style="background:#eaeaea;"
! scope="row" style="text-align:center" | 2016
|
| 39 || 4 || 0 || 1 || 18 || 18 || 36 || 10 || 8 || 0.0 || 0.3 || 4.5 || 4.5 || 9.0 || 2.5 || 2.0
|- class="sortbottom"
! colspan=3| Career
! 16
! 11
! 8
! 71
! 63
! 134
! 32
! 36
! 0.7
! 0.5
! 4.4
! 3.9
! 8.4
! 2.0
! 2.3
|}

References

External links
 
 

1993 births
Living people
Brisbane Lions players
Collingwood Football Club players
Australian rules footballers from Victoria (Australia)
Sandringham Dragons players